The 1997 Big 12 Conference baseball tournament was the first in Big 12 history, and the only one to be held at All Sports Stadium in Oklahoma City, OK from May 15 through 18.  Oklahoma won the inaugural tournament and earned the Big 12 Conference's automatic bid to the 1997 NCAA Division I baseball tournament. The format followed that used by the NCAA Division I Baseball Championship at the time: a six-team, double-elimination tournament.

Regular Season Standings
Source:

Colorado did not sponsor a baseball team.

Tournament

Iowa State, Kansas, Kansas State, Nebraska, and Texas did not make the tournament.

All-Tournament Team

See also
College World Series
NCAA Division I Baseball Championship
Big 12 Conference baseball tournament

References

Big 12 Tourney media guide 
Boydsworld 1997 Standings

Tournament
Big 12 Conference Baseball Tournament
Big 12 Conference baseball tournament
Big 12 Conference baseball tournament
Baseball competitions in Oklahoma City
College sports tournaments in Oklahoma